Shortolide A is a natural product isolated from Solidago shortii.   S. shortii is an endangered species native to the United States. Shortolide A is one of six diterpenes isolated from the species Solidago shortii. Three of these products are hydrolysis products. Solidago is common across North America but Solidago shortii is only found in a limited area where only 14 wild populations are known. Because of this, the species was designated as endangered.

Spectroscopic elucidation 

Shorotolide A is a colorless solid and is optically active. According to mass spectrometry and NMR the chemical formula is C25H36O5. ROESY correlations were used to determine the relative configuration. The absolute configuration was determined the comparison of calculated and experimental vibrational circular dichroism. Comparisons of calculated and experimental optical rotation was also used.

Proposed Synthesis 
A proposed synthesis is shown below.

References 

Diterpenes
Epoxides
Furanones